Khadija Aamir Yar Malik is a Pakistani politician who had been a member of the National Assembly of Pakistan from September 2010 to 2013.

Political career
She was elected to the National Assembly of Pakistan from Constituency NA-184 (Bahawalpur-II) as a candidate of Pakistan Peoples Party (PPP) in by-polls held in September 2010. She received 74,754 votes and defeated Najibuddin Awaisi.

She ran for the seat of the National Assembly from Constituency NA-184 (Bahawalpur-II) as a candidate of PPP in 2013 Pakistani general election, but was unsuccessful. She received 64,175 votes and lost the seat to Najibuddin Awaisi.

She ran for the seat of the National Assembly from Constituency NA-173 (Bahawalpur-IV) as a candidate of Pakistan Tehreek-e-Insaf (PTI) in 2018 Pakistani general election, but was unsuccessful. She received 60,211 votes and lost the seat to PML-N candidate Najibuddin Awaisi.

References

Living people
Pakistani MNAs 2008–2013
Women members of the National Assembly of Pakistan
Pakistan People's Party MNAs
Year of birth missing (living people)
21st-century Pakistani women politicians